It's Your Call is the eighteenth studio album by American country music artist Reba McEntire, released in December 1992. It contains the song "The Heart Won't Lie", which featured Vince Gill and which was later ranked at #18 on CMT's list of the 100 Greatest Country Duets. The album also includes a re-recording of the song "Baby's Gone Blues", which was recorded in 1987 by Patty Loveless for her album If My Heart Had Windows.

The album peaked at #1 on the country album chart and #8 on the Billboard 200, selling 104,000 copies in its first week, becoming her first top 10 album on that chart. It is certified 3× Multi-platinum by the RIAA.

McEntire referred to the album as a "second chapter to For My Broken Heart" (her previous album, released in 1991).

Track listing

Personnel 
As listed in liner notes.
 Reba McEntire – lead vocals, backing vocals
 John Barlow Jarvis – pianos, synthesizers
 Matt Rollings – pianos, synthesizers
 Steve Gibson – acoustic guitar, electric guitar
 George Marinelli, Jr. – electric guitar, acoustic guitar, mandolin
 Terry Crisp – steel guitar (1, 2)
 Michael Rhodes – bass guitar
 Paul Leim – drums
 Joe McGlohon – saxophone (3)
 Linda Davis – backing vocals
 Vince Gill – backing vocals, lead vocals (5)
 Vicki Hampton – backing vocals
 Mary Ann Kennedy – backing vocals
 Donna McElroy – backing vocals 
 Chris Rodriguez – backing vocals
 Jamie D. Robbins – backing vocals
 Pam Rose – backing vocals
 Harry Stinson – backing vocals

Production 
 Tony Brown – producer 
 Reba McEntire – producer
 John Guess – recording engineer, overdub recording, mixing 
 Marty Williams – second engineer, overdub recording
 Glenn Meadows – digital editing, mastering 
 Jessie Noble – project coordinator 
 Mickey Braithwaite – art direction, design 
 Jim McGuire – photography 
 Narvel Blackstock – management 
 Starstruck Entertainment – management

Charts

Weekly charts

Year-end charts

Certifications and sales

Singles

References

1992 albums
Reba McEntire albums
MCA Records albums
Albums produced by Tony Brown (record producer)